Unione degli Studenti (UdS), meaning The Students' Union, is an Italian  anti-fascist association of students, part of the OBESSU, the European platform for cooperation between the national school student unions. The current national coordinator is Luca Redolfi.

Before 2007, the UdS cooperated with CGIL, the biggest Italian Trade Union and consequently with UdU, one of the main Italian University Student Union. After the end of the relations with the CGIL, there was a division in the UdS and part of the former association members founded a new Student Union, called Rete degli Studenti, that became with two high school Student Associations, Rete degli Studenti Medi in 2008.
Student organisations in Italy